Fidel Maldonado (born July 23, 1991 in Albuquerque, New Mexico) is an American professional boxer and the current WBC Youth World Lightweight Champion.

Amateur career
Fidel was ranked #2 in the U.S. and had a record of 118-12 during his amateur career. In 2008 Maldonado won the U.S. Future Stars National Championship.

Professional career
He is signed to Oscar De La Hoya's Golden Boy Promotions. He Lost To Fernando Carcamo

References

External links

American people of Mexican descent
Lightweight boxers
1991 births
Living people
Boxers from Albuquerque, New Mexico
American male boxers